Carnell House is a mansion house and estate near the village of Hurlford about  south-east of Kilmarnock in South Ayrshire, Scotland,  from Glasgow. Carnell was previously known as Cairn Hill and dates back to 1276.

The house is set within a 2000-acre Estate which is divided into gardens, woodlands and farms. The present form of the house dates back to 1843, although the earlier towers adjoin the newer additions.

The house is home to the Findlay Family whose ancestry includes William Wallace. Ferrier-Hamilton, Hamilton-Findlay.

It was built by the Wallace Family and in 1750 was referred to as ‘Cairnhill’ on General Roy's map of 1750. Colonel John Ferrier Hamilton later made considerable improvements to the Estate and in 1843 he commissioned William Burn to build a new house. Georgina Findlay-Hamilton, John's granddaughter, upon inheriting the estate in 1904, made further alterations and was responsible for initially cultivating the 10 acre gardens the estate has today. It then passed to her son-in-law and daughter, Commander and Mrs J B Findlay and then to her son John R Findlay in 1965. Garden House was built in 1973 inside the walled garden. The house is now owned by John's second son Michael who usually resides there with his family.

The keep adjoining the house dates from the 15th century; it rises to three storeys and a garret, which has a parapet corbelled-out.  The vaulted basement has a wide kitchen fireplace.

References

External links
Official site
Robert Burns and the Carnell Estate Lime Kilns, Fiveways, South Ayrshire.
Researching the Life and Times of Robert Burns Researcher's site.

Country houses in East Ayrshire
Houses completed in 1843
Inventory of Gardens and Designed Landscapes
1843 establishments in Scotland